Acapella Audio Arts is a German manufacturer of loudspeakers, and one of the oldest hi-fi manufactures in Germany. Acapella Audio was founded by Alfred Rudolph and Herman Winters in 1978 in Duisburg, Germany. Acapella is famous for its heavy horn-loaded speakers that are able to reproduce the whole audible sound spectrum. Other signature characteristic for the products of the company is the widely utilized plasma tweeter technology.

The company’s flagship product, the Sphäron Excalibur has earned the company worldwide recognition. Standing at over seven feet tall and weighing 2,728 pounds, this $455,000 speaker is considered one of the world’s most unusual speakers.

History 
In 1961 while a student at architecture school, Alfred Rudolph made and designed 4-way speakers with an appealing sound. But after many sessions listening to the sound of trumpets, he became fascinated by the wide and vivid sound of them; this is when the idea of creating a modern trumpet came to the mind of Rudolph. In 1976, Alfred Rudolph and Hermann Winters met, both immediately felt the same fascination with the idea of the trumpet. Two years later, Acapella Audio Arts officially launched.

Technologies

The Ion-Plasma Tweeter 

The Ion-Plasma Tweeter is designed to recreate the most accurate, fastest and most sophisticated sound compared to the existing speakers in the world. When operating, the ion-beam fires plasma into oxygen in the air which can produce reactive by-products, Acapella is the only speaker company that eliminates this problem and is certified for health safety by the European Union (EU). In this way, the Acapella ion tweeter is able to reproduce sound without membrane and without mass. In terms of transient capabilities and phase stiffness, the obtained sound quality cannot be realised by using conventional tweeters.  With virtually zero mass, the ion tweeter can reproduce frequencies as high as 100 kHz, though in this case, it's limited to 30 kHz.

The Spherical Horn

Though the senior firm of the two, Acapella is actually not nearly as internationally famous as their colleagues at Avantgarde Acoustic. Both German companies are in the hornspeaker business but Acapella, as the older one, claims credit for being the spherical horn inventors (they began in 1978). The Avantgardists under the lead of Matthias Ruff meanwhile produce strikingly similar horns.

Products

Acapella Campanile MKII 
Specifications:
Efficiency: 93 dB/1W/1m
Impedance: 8 Ohm
Frequency Response: 20 Hz to 40 kHz
Power handling: 200 watts (Peak handling of 1000 watts at 10 ms with no distortion)
Recommended power output of the amplifier: from 15 watts
Overall Dimensions: 94.5" x 28.5" x 38" (HxWxD)
Weight: 550 - 650 lbs. per speaker

Acapella LaCampanella Alto MKIII 
Specifications:
Frequency Response: 20 Hz to 40 kHz
Efficiency: 95 dB/1W/1m
Power Handling: 100 watts (Peak handling of 1000 watts at 10 ms with no distortion)
Recommended power output of the amplifier: 15 watts
Dimensions: 88" x 16" x 27" (HxWxD)
Weight: 352 lbs. per speaker

Acapella Sphaeron Excalibur 
Specifications:
Efficiency: 100 dB/1W/1m
Power handling: 100 watts (Peak handling of 1000 watts at 10 ms with no distortion)
Recommended power output of the amplifier from: 15 watts
Dimensions: 90.5" x 59" x 51.2" (HxWxD)
Weight: 1364 lbs. per Speaker

Acapella ION TW 1S Ionic Plasma Tweeter 
Specifications:
Sensitivity: 1.5 V / 0 dB (active tweeter)
Impedance: 600 ohm 
Max Sound Pressure level: 110 dB, 1 m / 1 ms 
Slope Input Filter: approx. 12 dB / Octave 
Frequency Response: 5 kHz - 50 kHz (variable crossover frequencies) 
Mains Voltage: 110–120 V / 60 Hz 
Dimensions: 150 x 300 x 260 mm / 5.91 x 11.81 x 10.24" (H xWxD)
Weight: 15 kg. / 33 lbs.

See also 
 List of loudspeaker manufacturers
 High end audio
 Horn loudspeakers
 Klipsch Audio Technologies
 Oswalds Mill Audio

References

External links
 Official Website (English)

Loudspeaker manufacturers
Manufacturing companies based in Duisburg
Audio equipment manufacturers of Germany